The Portuguese municipalities are entitled to use a local flag with a coat of arms.

Rules regarding Portuguese vexillology and heraldry are quite strict (Law no. 53/91 of August 7th, 1991).

The colour(s) of the flag are defined in regulations published in the official journal and correspond to one or two most important tinctures used in the coat of arms.

Flags could be plain (one single colour) just with the coat of arms in the centre (used by municipalities headquartered both in cities and towns), quartered with two colours (used only by municipalities whose seat is a town) or gyronny with two colours (meaning that the seat of the municipality has the status of city).

The single exception to this rule can be found in the flag of the Lagos municipality, which is quartered diagonally (Portuguese franchado, or quartered per saltire), reflecting the association of the city with King Manuel I of Portugal, whose personal standard was also quartered per saltire.

See also

 List of Portuguese flags
 Portuguese vexillology

External links

References 

Portuguese
Flags of Portugal
Flags
Portugal
Portuguese